Gandhinagar South is one of the 182 Legislative Assembly constituencies of Gujarat state in India. It is part of Gandhinagar district. The seat came into existence after 2008 delimitation.

List of segments 
This assembly seat represents the following segments,

 Gandhinagar Taluka (Part) Villages – Adalaj (CT), Alampur, Ambapur, Amiyapur, Basan, Bhat, Bhoyan Rathod, Bhundiya, Chandkheda (M), Chandrala, Chekhalarani, Chhala, Chiloda (Naroda) (CT), Chiloda, Dabhoda, Dantali, Dashela, Dhanap, Dolarana Vasana, Galudan, Giyod, Isanpur Mota, Jakhora, Jamiyatpur, Karai, Khoraj, Koba, Koteshwar, Kudasan, Lavarpur, Lekawada, Limbadia, Madhavgadh, Magodi, Mahudara, Medra, Motera (CT), Nabhoi, Palaj, Pirojpur, Por, Prantiya, Pundarasan, Raipur, Rajpur, Ranasan, Randesan, Ratanpur, Raysan, Sadra, Sargasan, Shahpur, Shertha, Shiholi Moti, Sonarda, Sugad, Tarapur, Titoda, Unvarsad, Vadodara, Valad, Vankanerda, Vasana Hadmatia, Vira Talavdi, Zundal.

Member of Legislative Assembly

Election results

2022

2017

2012

See also
 List of constituencies of the Gujarat Legislative Assembly
 Gandhinagar district

References

External links
 

Assembly constituencies of Gujarat
Gandhinagar district